Bribri, also known as Bri-bri, Bribriwak, and Bribri-wak, is a Chibchan language, from a language family indigenous to the Isthmo-Colombian Area, which extends from eastern Honduras to northern Colombia and includes populations of those countries as well as Nicaragua, Costa Rica, and Panama. As of 2002, there were about 11,000 speakers left. An estimate by the National Census of Costa Rica in 2011 found that Bribri is currently spoken by 54.7% of the 12,785 Bribri people, about 7,000 individuals.  It is a tonal language whose word order is subject–object–verb.

There are three traditional dialects of Bribri: Coroma (in the western region of the Talamanca mountain range), Amubre (in the eastern region of the Talamanca mountain range) and Salitre (in the South Pacific area). Bribri is a tribal name, deriving from a word for "mountainous" in their own language. The Bribri language is also referred to as Su Uhtuk, which means "our language." Bribri is reportedly most similar to sister language Cabécar as both languages have nasal harmony, but they are mutually unintelligible.

Phonology

Consonants 

 /b/ can have allophones of [β, m].
 /d/ can have an allophone of [ɽ], as well as nasal allophones of [ɽ̃, n].
 /ɟ͡ʝ/ can have an allophone of [ɲ].
 /ɾ/ can have an allophone of [r].
 /w, j/ can have nasalised allophones of [w̃, j̃].

Vowels 
I, u and a are pronounced in the same manner as they would be in Spanish. E and o are more open than in Spanish. The sound of ë is between i and e, in the same manner as ö is between u and o. The nasal vowels are pronounced similarly to the corresponding orals, with the addition of some air exiting through the nose.

Alphabet 
The Linguistics Department at the University of Costa Rica has conceived a standardized spelling system that is based on several earlier attempts.

Nasal vowels are indicated by a tilde:   (Previously indicated with a macron below: a̱, e̱, i̱, o̱, u̱), except after a nasal consonant (already indicating nasalisation of the vowel).

Tones are indicated by the grave accent for the high tone and the acute accent for the low tone; these can also be placed on the nasal vowels.

See also
Bribri Sign Language

References

Bibliography

External links

 Portal de la lengua bribri. Bribri texts, audios and transcriptions, by Carla V. Jara and Alí García Segura
 Bribri's entry on the WALS
 A Bribri course with audio files: Jara Murillo, Carla con Alí García Segura. 2008. Materiales y Ejercicios para el Curso de Bribri I, Universidad de Costa Rica.
 Recordings of Bribri conversations and narratives from the Indigenous Languages of Costa Rica Collection of Laura Cervantes at AILLA.

Bribri people
Chibchan languages
Languages of Costa Rica
Tonal languages
Subject–object–verb languages